Mio Sugita (杉田 水脈 Sugita Mio, born April 22, 1967) is a Japanese politician. She is a member of the Liberal Democratic Party of Japan and incumbent member of the House of Representatives for the Proportional Chugoku Block.

Sugita has been criticized for her conservative views, including comments against gender diversity and the LGBT community. She spoke out on a streamed program in 2015 that the LGBT community should not receive support from taxpayer's money, and repeated her claim in a monthly magazine piece in 2018.

The Kishida cabinet appointed her  for Internal Affairs and Communications in  August 2022. She has since resigned from this position, because she had no intention of retracting some of her statements and to avoid disrupting administrative affairs, according to Kishida. When interviewed in that capacity, Sugita insisted that she had never dismissed diversity and had not discriminated against sexual minorities.

Early life and education 
Sugita graduated from the Faculty of Agriculture, Tottori University in 1990.

She worked as a Nishinomiya government employee and member of the Japan Restoration Party and the Next Generation Party before becoming a member of the Liberal Democratic Party of Japan.

After unsuccessfully running in the 2014 election for the Hyogo Prefectural 6th District (garnering the fewest votes of any candidate) as a member of The Party for Japanese Kokoro, Sugita changed parties, joining the Liberal Democratic Party. She next ran for the Proportional Chugoku Block as an LDP member, and was made a representative of that Block by the LDP, without having to rely directly on a direct election.

Sugita married at age 26. Her husband is an engineer. They have one child, a daughter.

Political career

Women using maiden names 
A debate has been continuing in Japan on whether or not married couples should be allowed to retain their own names after marriage and thus have different surnames. At present, married people must share the same surname, whether the husband's name or the wife's maiden name. During a Diet session on January 23, 2020, when this issue was being debated, a female Diet member shouted out of turn (called a "yaji" in Japanese), "if you don’t want your husband’s name, you shouldn’t get married!" The Diet member was reported to have been Sugita.

Nurseries 
In July 2016, Sugita wrote an article in the Sankei Shimbun opposing increases in the number of nurseries.

Comfort women 
Sugita has called the comfort women issue a fabrication. The statue commemorates as many as 200,000 "comfort women" from Korea and other countries "forced into sex slavery by Japanese soldiers during World War II". Statue opponents, including Sugita, said, "the women acted willingly" and that the numbers of them reported are inflated. The three politicians also stated that they wanted the Japanese Ministry of Foreign Affairs to retract an apology made in the 1990s to comfort women.

Shiori Itō rape case 
Sugita appeared in a 2018 BBC documentary "Japan's Secret Shame" which detailed the alleged rape of Shiori Itō. In the interview, Sugita was quoted as saying, "With this case, there were clear errors on her part as a woman; drinking that much in front of a man and losing her memory. With things like this I think men are the ones who suffer significant damage". Sugita also laughed at an illustration with a woman apparently made to look like Itō and the words "failure at sleeping around for business".

The video has subsequently drawn criticism on social media. Sugita was criticized by Lully Miura, an instructor at the Policy Alternatives Research Institute at the University of Tokyo who wrote, "Behavior as if questioning the actions of the victim instead of the perpetrator will spread the misunderstanding that it cannot be helped if something happens to a woman when she gets drunk in front of a man. There seems to be a sense of dislike against women strongly speaking up to men that is embedded in Sugita's attitude." When approached for comment about the documentary by the Mainichi Shimbun, Sugita stated the video had been edited in a way that misrepresented her intentions and she was considering releasing her own footage of the interview.

In September 2020, at a party gathering for the LDP government, participants claimed that Sugita remarked, "Women can tell lies as much as they want," during a briefing about the government's support program for sexual violence victims. The remark was likely related to Itō, a controversial figure due to her rape allegations, who was recently selected by Time magazine, as one of the world's 100 Most Influential People of 2020. Sugita later denied having made those comments.

In October 2022 Sugita was ordered by the Tokyo High Court to pay Itō ¥550,000 in damages for clicking "like" on several Twitter tweets that Itō alleged defamed her. In overturning the dismissal of the litigation by the Tokyo District Court, the High Court found that Sugita's actions intentionally harmed Itō's dignity.

LGBT issues 
In June 2015, Sugita made an appearance on the Japanese Culture Channel Sakura television program Hi Izuru Kuni Yori alongside music composer Koichi Sugiyama and fellow politician Kyoko Nakayama in which she claimed that there was no need for LGBT education in schools, dismissing concerns about high suicide rates among the community. She went on to quip "Where is the justification in [spending taxpayer's money] to support homosexual people who are not 'productive' [i.e., do not produce children]". In July 2018, Sugita wrote a controversial magazine article that said tax money should not be used to fund LGBT right initiatives because same-sex couples cannot reproduce and have "no productivity." Her comments were denounced by various prominent Japanese politicians, including former Japanese prime minister Yukio Hatoyama, with thousands of protesters gathering outside the headquarters of the Liberal Democratic Party on July 27, 2018, to demand her resignation from the party. Two months later, a group of LGBT politicians and civil rights leaders demanded that she account for the comments.

2022 cabinet reshuffle 
Sugita was appointed as Parliamentary Vice-Minister at the Ministry of Internal Affairs and Communications in the reshuffled cabinet of Prime Minister Fumio Kishida in August 2022.

References

External links 

1967 births
Members of the House of Representatives (Japan)
Far-right politics in Japan
Representatives
Conservatism in Japan
20th-century Japanese lawyers
Anti-abortion activists
Japanese conspiracy theorists
Japanese nationalists
21st-century Japanese politicians
Politicians from Hyōgo Prefecture
Right-wing populism in Japan
Liberal Democratic Party (Japan) politicians
Living people
Historical negationism